Ber is a tropical fruit tree species belonging to the family Rhamnaceae.

Ber may also refer to:

 Ber (name)
 Ber (musician), Berit Dybing, an American musician
 Ber, Slavic name for the Greek city of Veria
 Ber, Mali
 In mathematics, Ber is one of the Kelvin functions
 Basal electrical rhythm, in gastrointestinal physiology
 Base excision repair, a biological process for repairing DNA
 Basic Encoding Rules, defined as part of the ASN.1 as a transmission encoding standard
 Benign early repolarization, which is a particular finding on ECG
 Berber languages (ISO 639-3: ber), a language family of Northern Africa
 Bit error rate, in digital communications, the number of bit errors divided by the total number of transferred bits
 Building energy rating, applied to property in Ireland
 Another name for Wer (god)

See also

 Bear (disambiguation)
 Beer (disambiguation)
 Berr, a surname
 Le Ber, a surname